"Love or Let Me Be Lonely" is a pop song recorded by the soul group The Friends of Distinction and released as a single in early 1970. The song was a multi-format success, peaking in the top 10 of the Billboard Hot 100 at #6 on May 1, 1970 and at #13 on the R&B chart. On the Adult Contemporary singles charts, "Love or Let Me Be Lonely" went to #9.
The song is ranked as the 63rd biggest hit of 1970.

Chart performance

Weekly charts

Year-end charts

Paul Davis version
The song returned to the charts in the summer of 1982 in a version by Paul Davis, which reached number 40 on the Hot 100 and number 11 on the U.S. Adult Contemporary chart.

Chart performance

References

External links
 

1970 singles
1982 singles
The Friends of Distinction songs
Maxine Nightingale songs
Paul Davis (singer) songs
Songs written by Skip Scarborough
Songs written by Jerry Peters
Music published by MPL Music Publishing
1970 songs
RCA Victor singles
Arista Records singles
Songs written by Anita Poree
Songs about loneliness